Joseph Zhang Xianwang (born 12 January 1965) is a Chinese Catholic priest, Metropolitan Archbishop of Jinan since 2008.

Biography
Zhang was born in Pingyin County, Shandong, on January 12, 1965. After high school, he entered the Shanghai Sheshan Monastery. In March 1997, he was accepted to KU Leuven, where he graduated in June 1998.

He was ordained a priest on December 8, 1990. On April 29, 2004, he became the Roman Catholic Coadjutor Bishop of Ji'nan. On May 18, 2008, after the death of Archbishop Zhao Ziping, he became Metropolitan Archbishop of Ji'nan.

References

1965 births
People from Jinan
Living people
21st-century Roman Catholic bishops in China
KU Leuven alumni